One Step Closer is an album by renowned R&B/Hip hop singer-songwriter/keyboardist/record producer Gavin Christopher. Released in 1986, this album contained Christopher's biggest solo hit, with the title track, "One Step Closer to You" reaching number 22 on the pop charts, number 25 on the R&B chart, and number 9 on the Dance chart. The follow-up single, "Back in Your Arms" could not duplicate this success, and the album fell off the charts.

The album also includes Christopher's own version of "Once You Get Started," a tune he had originally written for Rufus and Chaka Khan that became a top-ten Pop, R&B, and Dance hit for the group in the 1970s.  Rufus guitarist Tony Maiden, who had shared lead vocals with Chaka Khan on the group's original recording (and had been Christopher's bandmate in the pre-Rufus group, High Voltage), provides backing vocals in addition to guitar on Christopher's version.

One Step Closer remains Gavin Christopher's most successful solo album to date, having peaked at number 74 on the Billboard 200 and number 36 on the Top R&B/Hip-Hop Albums chart on August 9, 1986.

The album is also notable for being the first successful project for the then-fledgling production team of Carl Sturken and Evan Rogers.

Track listing
 "One Step Closer to You" (Evan Rogers, Carl Sturken, Jeff Pescetto, David Grant) (5:10)
 "Are We Running From Love" (Gavin Christopher, Paul Pesco) (4:46)
 "In the Heat of Passion" (Rogers, Sturken) (5:07)
 "Back in Your Arms" (Rogers, Sturken, Christopher) (5:36)
 "Once You Get Started" (Christopher) (4:18)
 "Love is Knocking at Your Door" (Rogers, Sturken, Nick Mundy, Christopher) (5:09)
 "Sparks Turn Into Fire" (Rogers, Sturken) (4:30)
 "Could This Be the Night" (Christopher) (4:29)
 "That's the Kind of Guy I Am" (Christopher, Pesco) (4:10)

Personnel
 Gavin Christopher - lead vocals on all tracks, additional instruments as noted below
 Carl Sturken and Evan Rogers - drum programming

Additional track-by-track personnel

"One Step Closer to You"
 Carl Sturken - keyboards, guitar
 Tom Mandell (sic) - additional keyboards
 Evan Rogers - backing vocals

"Are We Running From Love"
 Robbie Kilgore - keyboards
 Tony Maiden - guitar
 Evan Rogers, Bunny Hill, Clydene Jackson - backing vocals

"In the Heat of Passion"
 Carl Sturken - keyboards
 John Nevin - bass
 Evan Rogers, Audrey Wheeler - backing vocals

"Back in Your Arms"
 Carl Sturken - keyboards, guitar
 Evan Rogers, Siedah Garrett - backing vocals

"Once You Get Started"
 Carl Sturken - keyboards, guitar
 Tony Maiden - guitar, backing vocals
 Roger Byam - saxophone solo
 Evan Rogers, Toni Smith - backing vocals

"Love is Knocking at Your Door"
 Carl Sturken - keyboards
 Paul Pesco - guitar, backing vocals
 Evan Rogers, Gavin Christopher - backing vocals

"Sparks Turn Into Fire"
 Carl Sturken - keyboards, guitar
 Paul Pesco - guitar solo, backing vocals
 Evan Rogers - backing vocals

"Could This Be the Night"
 Gavin Christopher - keyboards, synthesizer soloing
 Carl Sturken - keyboards
 Keith Andès - keyboards, backing vocals
 Evan Rogers - backing vocals

"That's the Kind of Guy I Am"
 Paul Pesco - keyboards, guitar
 Carl Sturken - keyboards
 Robbie Kilgore - keyboards
 Gary Wallace - drum programming
 Evan Rogers, Gavin Christopher - backing vocals

References

1986 albums
Albums produced by Carl Sturken and Evan Rogers
Manhattan Records albums